The Embassy of Germany in Tel Aviv is Germany's diplomatic mission to Israel. 

Since April 2022, the embassy is located at 2 Hashlosha Street, Tel Aviv. The embassy is also home to a consulate, various departments and a military attaché. The current ambassador is Steffen Seibert.

See also
List of diplomatic missions in Israel

External links 

 German Embassy in Tel Aviv
 German Foreign Office

Tel Aviv
Germany
Germany–Israel relations